Abergwydol is a village in the Welsh principal area of Powys located on the A489 road between Cemmaes Road and Penegoes. It is part of the community of Cadfarch.

References

External links 

Photos of Abergwydol and surrounding area on geograph

Abergwydol listed building

Villages in Powys
Cadfarch